Walking in Circles is an album of rock band FliT. Released on December 19, 2017, the album consists of 9 songs. This is a re-released English version of their album that was extremely popular in Ukraine a few years ago.

Track listing

Personnel 
 Volodymyr Novikov — guitar, vocals
 Igor Ozarko — drums, backing vocals
 Roman Boyko — bass guitar, backing vocals

References 

2017 debut albums